Mike Dabulas (born December 13, 1996) is a United States rugby union player, currently playing for the Old Glory DC of Major League Rugby (MLR) and the United States national team. His preferred position is fly-half or fullback.

Professional career
Dabulas signed for Major League Rugby side Old Glory DC for the 2021 Major League Rugby season, having also played for the side in 2020. 

Dabulas debuted for United States against Canada during the 2023 Rugby World Cup – Americas qualification.

References

External links
itsrugby.co.uk Profile

1996 births
Living people
United States international rugby union players
Old Glory DC players
Rugby union fly-halves
Rugby union fullbacks
People from Westfield, New Jersey
American rugby union players